Penglipuran Village is one of the traditional villages located in Bangli Regency, Bali Province, Indonesia. Penglipuran village is famous as one of the tourist destinations in Bali because of its society who still preserve their traditional culture in their daily lives. The architecture of buildings and land processing still follows the concept of Tri Hita Karana, the philosophy of Balinese society regarding the balance of relations between God, humans and their environment. Penglipuran Village succeeded in building tourism that benefited all of their communities without losing their culture and traditions. In 1995, Penglipuran Village also received a Kalpataru award from the Indonesian Government for its efforts to protect the Bamboo Forest in their local ecosystem.

Geography 
Penglipuran village is one of the traditional villages from Bangli district and Bali province, Indonesia. The total area of this village reaches 112 hectares with an altitude of 500–600 meters above the sea and located about 5 kilometers from the Bangli City and 45 kilometers from the Denpasar City. The village is surrounded by other traditional villages. Kayang village in the north, Kubu village in the east, Gunaksa village in the south and Sansang river in the west. Temperatures vary from cool to cold (16-29 degrees) and averages rainfall around 2000 mm per year. Ground surface is considered flat with a height of 1–15 meters.

History 
Penglipuran Village is believed to be inhabited during the reign of I Dewa Gede Putu Tangkeban III. Almost all of the villagers believe that they are from Bayung Gede Village. In that time, the people of Bayung Gede were people who were experts in religious, custom and defense activities. Because of their abilities, they are often called to the Bangli Kingdom. But because of the distance, the Bangli kingdom finally provided a temporary area for the people of Bayung Gede to rest. This place is often referred to as a Kubu Bayung. Kubu means "camp" and "bayung" means people from Bayung Gede village. This place is then believed to be the village they live in now. They also believe that this is the reason that explains the similarity of traditional rules and building structure between Penglipuran village and Bayung Gede village.

Regarding the origin of the word Panglipuran Village, there are two different perceptions that are believed by the community. The first is Penglipuran means "pengeling pura" with "Pengeling" means to remember and "temple" means ancestral place. The second perception says that penglipura comes from the word "pelipur" which means comfort and "lipur" which means unhappiness. So if combined, penglipuran means a place for consolation. This perception arises because the Bangli king is said to often visit this village to meditate.

Society

Population 
Based on records from Kelihan Dinas (officials below lurah that specifically handling government administration) in 2002, up until July there were 832 people living in Penglipuran Village. The 832 individuals consisted of 425 men and 407 women with 197 head of family. The families are divided by their status which is 76 head of families with Pangayah / Karma Pangarep status (permanent members with customary rights and obligations) and 121 heads of families with Pangayah/Krama Roban status (temporary member referred to as the responsibility of one of Pangayah Pangarep).

The most recent data in early 2012 showed that there is no visible increase in the population of Penglipuran Village which consists of 980 individuals joined in 229 families (76 families), issued by I Wayan Kajeng, Chief Administrative of the Penglipuran Traditional Village. In 12 years the population in this village increased by 200 people.

Education and job 
In 2002, 426 people from Penglipuran Village completed their elementary education, while 91 people had an education level up to junior high school. 156 people completed high school and 68 people managed to complete the highest level of education which is University. Most of Penglipuran Village people choose farming as their job, followed by becoming a private employee. The rest is divided between civil servants/ABRI, traders, breeders, craftsmen and the last one is laborers.

Marriage 
Marriage and the family lineage is seen as something that very important for people of Penglipuran Village. The majority of people in Penglipuran Village married the people from their own village too in order to preserve the family lineage. Therefore, most of the population is still bound by blood relations with each other. If there is a man from Penglipuran Village who marries a woman from another clan/family outside of Penglipuran Village, then he still has to carry out his obligation as a member of the Penglipuran Village society.

Tri Mandala Land Management 
The land management of Penglipuran Village is strongly influenced by Tri Mandala. According to Tri Mandala's concept, the land is divided into 3 zones according to the value of their purity. The zone will then be placed according to the spiritual orientation called "Kaja-Kelod". Things that are considered the most sacred will be placed towards Mount Agung (the most sacred place in Bali) and the opposite of the most sacred things will be placed towards the sea.

 Utama Mandala is at the northernmost side of the village, therefore this zone is considered as the most sacred place. It contains places called "Pura" or temples to worship of gods. Pura Puseh Desa is used to worship the god Brahma (creator god) and Pura Bale Agung is used to worship the God Wisnu (god of preservation).
 Madya mandala is a zone for humans. Here the people of Penglipuran Village will live with their families in a building unit called the "Pekarangan".
 Nista mandala is in the southernmost side of the village and is an impure zone. Therefore, it contains the village grave and Pura Dalem or a place to worship God Shiva (god of destroyer).

The number of yards in this village is 77 with 1 "karang memadu" (a special "pekarangan" for family who do polygamy) and 76 "karang kerti". Karang Kerti means a place to serve god by having a good married life.

Like village land management, the Pekarangan unit also follows the Tri Mandala concept. "Utama Mandala" in one's pekarangan will contain a family temple to worship their god and ancestors. "Madya mandala" will consist of a kitchen, a bedroom, etc. where daily activities take place. Finally, Nista Mandala is usually used to dry clothes and store livestock.

One of the main components of almost entire building in desa Penglipuran is bamboo. They use 4-5 layers of bamboo that are linked to each other to build roofs and weave bamboo to make room dividing walls. But lately they has begun to use modern construction because of the large amount of bamboo cut. One Pekarangan unit can be entered through two sides with the main door shaped like a gate and called "angkul-angkul". One of the other important buildings in this village is Bale Banjar. This building does not have walls and is shared by residents for mass Ngaben ceremonies or community meetings.

Awig-Awig 
To achieve mutual harmony in the community, residents of the Penglipuran Village have two types of laws that they obey and follow, named Awig (written rules) and Drestha (unwritten customs).

Monogamy
For the people of Penglipuran Village, polygamy or having more than one wife is prohibited and considered taboo. If a person has more than one wife, he and his wives must move from Karang Kerti to Karang Memandu (outer part of the village). His rights and obligation as part of Penglipuran Village society are also revoked. After the person has moved, the villagers will build a house for them to live on but they will not be able to pass through public roads or enter the temple nor attend the traditional activities.

Worship at Given Temple 
Not all temple can be visited by everyone to worship except the main temple which is Pura Besakih. Therefore, Hindus of Bali have temples that they worship and go to. These temples are distinguished by their respective families, including the Penglipuran Traditional Village.

Obligations to the main temple - Gebog Doma (Inter Regional) 
Because the people of Penglipuran Village are immigrants that has just come to a new area, so they have to worship the nearest temple of their area, Kehen Temple, which is the largest temple in the Bangli Region.

Obligations to Kahyangan Tiga (Inter-Village) 
The most important obligation for Balinese people is to worship "Kahyangan-Tiga" located in their respective villages. In the Village of Penglipuran the obligation is divided into:
 Penataran Temple - Temples to worship deity Brahma as the creator of the entire universe. The temple is located in the center of village, next to Puseh Temple.
 Puseh Temple - Temple to worship deity Vishnu as a support for all of life. This temple is located in the most sacred place in the Penglipuran Village, and is the first temple built in this village.
 Dalem Temple - Temple to worship deity Shiva as a god of fusion. Therefore, this temple is located at the bottom of the village, leading to the sea. The villagers believe that it will help the souls of deceased people to return to their place.

Every 210 days based on the Balinese calendar, there is a Galungan celebration organized by Kahyangan-Tiga members. Every citizen must prepare offerings, food, and things needed for the celebration.

Obligations in the Family Temple 
In each family home yard there is a Sanggah or a small temple intended for the ancestors of the family.

Village Governance System 
The Penglipuran Customary Village Government System was compiled in an Indigenous Leadership Institution called Prajuru Desa Adat Penglipuran. This institution consists of two parts named Kanca Roras and Bendesa or Kelihan Adat.

Kanca Roras 
Kanca Roras is a representative assembly with 12 members. Kanca Roras is taken from the word Ka-anca which means assigned and roras / rolas which means twelve. Kanca roras has a function resembling an assembly of representatives or a legislative body and its formation is based on the order of leadership in the name of the ulu-apad system.

Kelihan Adat 
Kelihan Adat are people who are chosen and is an elder in the custom. Kelihan Adat are executive officials whose appointments are made through elections at a public meeting (kajudi ring paruman desa). Kelihan adat have a duty only if they are given a mandate from Kanca Roras.

Bamboo in Penglipuran Village 
Bamboo from the Penglipuran Village is one of the best bamboo that can be found in Bali. The Penglipuran Village society believe that the bamboo forest does not grow by itself but rather planted by their ancestors. Therefore bamboo is considered a symbol of their historical roots. The bamboo forests that grow in the Penglipuran Village have an area of 37.7 hektare (previously 50 hektare) and consist of 15 bamboo species which are all owned by the village. Some of these forests are managed directly under the Adat Desa as a Laba Pura (for the maintenance of temple buildings) while some are managed by several residents with use rights status.

Bamboo is also used by the people of Penglipuran village as a materials for building and housing. Some of the buildings that are built using bamboo as the material are:

Pawon 
This building functions as a kitchen in which there is a rice barn and a small place to rest. Pawon is built entirely of bamboo including roof, wall, bed, and even the tableware inside it.

Bale Sakenem 
Bale Sakenem is a place for religious ceremonies that are exclusive only for the family. The ceremony that is often performed at Bale Sakenem is ceremony of Pitra Yadnya (Ngaben) and Manusa Yadnya ceremony. This building uses bamboo as its roof.

Bale Banjar 
Bale Banjar is a building that can be used by all the people in Penglipuran Village. This village has no walls, only a support pillar and is used for mass Ngaben ceremonies and community gathering.

Penglipuran Village as a tourist place 
Penglipuran is a village that still maintains their culture, traditions and bamboo forests in accordance with the principles of Tri Hita Karana. This then becomes an attraction for tourists to come to visit. Therefore, starting in 1993, the Balinese government promoted Penglipuran as a tourist destination. The Penglipuran community realizes their potential and applies "community-based-tourism" to avoid tourism capitalism in their village. With this concept, no individual will benefit directly from tourism because these benefits will be allocated for village development. Tourism actors such as tour guides, ticket guards and other officers will be directly employed by the village and get paid from the amount of profit earned, for example 40% of the total ticket sales.

In addition, before the concept was implemented, the people of Penglipuran village were usually able to benefit by inviting tourists to their "pekarangan" while explaining their traditions and culture. This is considered unfair because houses far from the main gate tend to get fewer opportunities. Therefore, through this new concept, all houses are given a number and the tour guide will provide a number with a rotating system to groups of tourists who come to visit. Each house is also given the opportunity to sell souvenirs in their Pekarangan by following their new concepts, for example 5,000 IDR from each sold souvenirs must be given back to support village development.

Before 2012, due to poor accommodations, tourists only spent 10–20 minutes in the village but many tourists ask to stay to spend more time in the village. At that time they were still doubtful because tourists might be a threat to their culture and traditions. But after 2012, tourists are allowed to stay after debriefing on how to behave in accordance with tradition and culture. This was later considered to have a good impact because it could expand employment opportunities in the future.

References

Museums in Bali
Villages in Bali
Open-air museums
Outdoor structures in Indonesia